Rhyacionia duplana, the summer shoot moth or Elgin shoot moth when referring to subspecies logaea, is a moth of the family Tortricidae. It is found from northern and central Europe to eastern Russia, China (Beijing, Hebei, Shanxi, Liaoning, Jiangsu, Shandong, Henan, Shaanxi) and Japan. It has also been reported from Korea, but it has not been found in recent studies.

The wingspan is 14–18 mm. The flight period of the adults usually starts in April, in warmer areas often in March.

The larvae feed on Pinus sylvestris, Pinus contorta var. latifolia, Pinus thunbergii and Picea sitchensis. Damage occurs especially in 5 to 12-year-old pine trees. Infested shoots desiccate and drop to the soil. Bush growth or even dying of the crown top may be the results of repeated strong infestations.

Subspecies
Rhyacionia duplana duplana
Rhyacionia duplana simulata Heinrich, 1928 (Japan)

References

External links
Eurasian Tortricidae

Olethreutinae
Moths of Japan
Moths of Europe